Leones de Santo Domingo is a professional basketball team based in Santo Domingo, Dominican Republic. The team currently plays in Dominican top division Liga Nacional de Baloncesto.

Championships
Liga Nacional de Baloncesto  (1x) 
2011

References

Basketball teams established in 2005
Basketball teams in the Dominican Republic